Yaroslavka is a rural locality (a selo) and the administrative centre of Yaroslavsky Selsoviet, Duvansky District, Bashkortostan, Russia. The population was 2,301 as of 2010. There are 26 streets.

Geography 
Yaroslavka is located 50 km northwest of Mesyagutovo (the district's administrative centre) by road. Voznesenka is the nearest rural locality.

References 

Rural localities in Duvansky District
Ufa Governorate